Yuval Fuchs (born 1961) is an Israeli diplomat. Until August 2016, he was the Ambassador of Israel to Georgia and non-resident Ambassador to Armenia.

Biography

Yuval Fuchs was born and raised in Haifa. His ancestors were deeply rooted in Safed and Rosh Pina, and were among the founders of Kfar Tavor. In 1979 he enlisted in the Israel Defense Forces for three years compulsory service, and served in the Nahal Brigade. He then spent a year on a kibbutz.

From 1985 to 1988 he attended the Hebrew University of Jerusalem and earned a BA in Philosophy and History. From 1989 to 1991, he studied at the University of Freiburg in Germany, graduating with a master's degree in Philosophy and History. During his studies in Germany, he worked as a research assistant and Hebrew teacher at the University of Frieburg and the University of Hamburg.

Diplomatic career
In 1994 joined the Israeli Foreign Service and has served in various positions in the Israeli diplomatic missions in Prague, Berlin and Moscow. In August 2012 he was appointed Israel's ambassador to Georgia and non-resident ambassador to Armenia until August 2016.

References

External links
 Yuval Fuchs Embassy of Israel in Tbilisi

1961 births
Living people
Israeli Jews
Israeli civil servants
People from Haifa
Ambassadors of Israel to Georgia (country)
Ambassadors of Israel to Armenia